Route 280 is a bus route in England that operates between Preston and Skipton.

History 
In March 2016 Transdev Blazefield withdrew from operating the route due to the withdrawal of subsidies. It was taken over by Preston Bus on a commercial basis who operated the route until June 2019. The route was taken over by Stagecoach Merseyside & South Lancashire with a £80,000 yearly subsidy from Lancashire County Council.

Route 
The route operates hourly between Preston and Skipton via Clitheroe.

References

Bus routes in England